For Macau is a political party in Macau, China. In the Legislative Council election in 2005, it had 892 votes (0.71% of popular vote) and no seats.

See also
List of political parties in Macau
Elections in Macau
2005 Macau legislative election

Political parties in Macau
Political parties of minorities